Salasi or Salsi, also rendered as Salaseh, may refer to:
 Salasi Olya
 Salasi Sofla